Themistokleio Sports Center is an indoor arena in Limassol, Cyprus. It is the home venue of Anorthosis VC. Currently the arena has a capacity around 3,500 seats.

Indoor arenas in Cyprus
Sport in Limassol
Buildings and structures in Limassol